Roseingrave is a surname. Notable people with the surname include:

 Carina Roseingrave, Irish camogie player
 Daniel Roseingrave (died 1727), Anglo-Irish organist and composer
 Ralph Roseingrave (c. 1695 – 1747), Anglo-Irish organist, son of Daniel Roseingrave
 Siobhan Roseingrave, Irish general election candidate, daughter of Tomás Roseingrave
 Thomas Roseingrave (1690/91 – 1766), Anglo-Irish organist and composer, son of Daniel Roseingrave
 Tomás Roseingrave (1918–1993), Irish social scientist

Surnames
Surnames of Irish origin
Surnames of British Isles origin